The Iron Stair is a 1920 British silent-era crime film directed by F. Martin Thornton from the novel The Iron Stair by Rita. It starred Reginald Fox and Madge Stuart. A subsequent adaptation of the same story The Iron Stair was made in 1933 directed by Leslie S. Hiscott.

References

External links

1920 films
1920 crime films
British crime films
British silent feature films
Films directed by Floyd Martin Thornton
British black-and-white films
1920s British films